Ooruki Monagadu is a 1981 Indian Telugu-language action comedy film directed by K. Raghavendra Rao. The film stars Krishna and Jaya Prada. It was remade in Hindi as Himmatwala (1983). It marked the third collaboration of actor Krishna with K. Raghavendra Rao after Bhale Krishnudu (1980) and the highly successful Gharana Donga (1980). The film was a hit at the box office becoming the second highest-grossing Telugu film of the year 1981.

Plot
Master Dharma Murti witnesses a murder of a man at the hands of Sher Singh Bandookwala. But Sher Singh with his might, terror, and money sets free. In revenge, he places Dharam Murti in an awkward position with a lady teacher, Menaka. Dharam Murti ashamed of this vacates his village and abandons his wife & children. His wife Savitri helps her son Ravi become an engineer who then resolves to fight against Bandookwala and get his father's spoilt reputation back. Bandookwala has terrorised all the villagers. His daughter Rekha follows in his footsteps and grows into an insensitive woman who tries to harass people. Ravi's sister Padma has to marry Munimji's son Shakti as she is pregnant with his child. After marriage, Shakti and Bandookwala together start harassing Padma. Rekha falls in love with Ravi and decides to play the same trick against the Bandookwala by pretending to be pregnant with Ravi's child. Ravi finds his father as a worker on a dam construction site. Ravi then presents Bandookwala guilty before the panchayat but is freed by Dharam Murti on the condition that he should show affection to the poor and treat them well. Finally, Bandookwala becomes a good man and then Ravi marries Rekha.

Cast

Music

References

External links
 

1981 films
1980s Telugu-language films
Films scored by K. Chakravarthy
Films directed by K. Raghavendra Rao
Telugu films remade in other languages
1980s action comedy-drama films
Indian action comedy-drama films